Naisbitt is a surname. Notable people with the surname include:

Carol Naisbitt (1922–1974), victim of the 1974 Hi-Fi murders
Danny Naisbitt (born 1978), English footballer
John Naisbitt (1929–2021), American author and public speaker in the area of futures studies